Matthew Chapdelaine (born July 28, 1988) is a former professional Canadian football wide receiver. He most recently played for the BC Lions of the Canadian Football League. He was drafted 42nd overall by the Lions in the 2010 CFL Draft and signed a contract with the team on May 25, 2010. He played college football for the Alberta Golden Bears before transferring to Simon Fraser University. Chapdelaine suffered a stress fracture in his foot prior to the 2009 season and never played for the Simon Fraser Clan.

References

1987 births
Living people
Alberta Golden Bears football players
BC Lions players
Canadian football wide receivers
Players of Canadian football from Ontario
Simon Fraser Clan football players
Sportspeople from Burlington, Ontario